The Voice is the second studio album by American rapper Mike Jones. It was released on April 28, 2009 by Warner Bros. Records, Asylum Records and Ice Age Entertainment. Production was handled by several producers, including Jim Jonsin, Mr. Collipark, J.R. Rotem and Big E, among others.

The album sold 25,000 copies in its first week, debuting at number 12 on the US Billboard 200 on April 22, 2009. As of February 1, 2014, the album has sold 200,000 copies in the United States.

Singles
The album's lead single "Drop & Gimme 50" features Hurricane Chris. The album's second single "Cuddy Buddy" featuring T-Pain, Twista and Lil Wayne. The album's third single "Next to You" featuring Nae Nae. The album's fourth single "Swagg Thru The Roof" featuring Swole. The album's fifth single "Boi!" featuring Young Problemz.

Critical reception

The Voice garnered mixed reviews from music critics. AllMusic's David Jeffries gave praise to the album's three singles and "Give Me a Call" but felt the rest of the track listing contained "redundant cuts and overdone party numbers" with Jones' overused gimmicky catchphrases. He called the record a "significant step up" from The American Dream EP. Nathan Slavik of DJBooth highlighted both "Next to You" and "Cuddy Buddy" as potential radio chart-toppers but found the album going into "unlistenable territory" with tracks ranging from a "half-baked" dance craze ("Drop & Gimmie 50"), butchering of a celebratory anthem ("Happy Birthday") and "Scandalous Hoes II". Slavik concluded by giving his take on Jones' next project: "Sadly expectations will be low after The Voice, here's hoping he truly delivers something unexpected." Conversely, Steve 'Flash' Juon from RapReviews praised Jones for delivering a decently paced album that has catchy beats to invigorate the collaborative tracks while also showcasing both his lyrical and vocal improvements from the past four years, concluding with "Regardless of the reasons it's clear that Mike Jones is a more seasoned and polished pro of the rap game, and The Voice is planning to have a long career in hip-hop music. Let's hope there's no more politics and bullshit getting in the way of his career."

Track listing

References

2009 albums
Mike Jones (rapper) albums
Asylum Records albums
Albums produced by Mike Dean (record producer)
Albums produced by J. R. Rotem
Albums produced by Jim Jonsin
Albums produced by Mannie Fresh